The Feneș (in its upper course: Finișel) is a right tributary of the river Someșul Mic in Romania. It discharges into the Someșul Mic in Luna de Sus.

References

Rivers of Romania
Rivers of Cluj County